A Man Alive is the fourth studio album by alternative folk band Thao & The Get Down Stay Down, released on the Ribbon Music label in March 2016.

Background 
The subject matter of the album was inspired by Thao Nguyen's relationship with her estranged father, who "left when I was maybe 11 or 12, my parents split up. And so he kinda just floated away but you never knew when he would come back and you never knew when he would just leave."

"This record, you know a lot of that is me releasing whatever I have to and grieving in whatever way, and having a lot of anger and then trying to sort of move forward, to forgive," Nguyen says. "But then a few songs later, I could leave him for dead."

Composition 
The decision to pair personal subject matter with upbeat music was a conscious one, inspired by reactions to the band's live performances. "The most fulfilling parts of our live show, that we love the most and what the crowd seemed to love the most were beat and bass driven. I wanted to move away from chordally based songs, and I wanted to rely more heavily on the beat and the groove. We wanted to pay more tribute to hip-hop influences...Once I realized what this record would be about, then it was definitely a non-negotiable in that it would be fun to perform. You can’t be sad every night without fail."

According to Nguyen, the song "Meticulous Bird" is "about various abuses of power, sexual assault and abuse in particular. I wanted whoever to be able to scream 'I take my body back.'"

Recording 
The album is the second collaboration between Nguyen and producer Merrill Garbus, leader of the Tune-Yards project, following Garbus's work on Nguyen's 2011 Thao + Mirah album.

On their collaboration, Nguyen says "She was everything I needed her to be: a steward in support. I didn't want to put 'Millionaire' on the record because it felt too vulnerable, and she said, 'Are you fucking kidding? Of course we’re putting it on the record'—which is what I needed."

Promotion 
To promote A Man Alive, Nguyen and Garbus created a video with Funny or Die dissecting the making of the song "Astonished Man" which parodied a video made by The New York Times that featured Diplo and Skrillex, and Justin Bieber discussing the making of the Jack Ü song, "Where Are Ü Now."

Accolades

Track listing

Personnel

Musicians
 Lynne Angel - drum samples, inspiration
 Merrill Garbus - bass, cabasa, clapping, farfisa organ, flute, producer, sampling, vocals, backing vocals
 Thao Nguyen - bass, clapping, composer, drum programming, drums, guitar, loops, mandolin, oscillator, percussion, telecaster, toy piano, univox, vocals
 Johanna Kunin - clapping, vocals, backing vocals
 Sami Perez - clapping, backing vocals
 Jason Slota - clapping, cowbell, drums, gamelan, percussion, shaker, tambourine
 Beau Sorenson - clapping, engineer, guitar, linn drum, loops, mixing, programming, sampling, sequencing
 Adam Thompson - audio manipulation, bass, casio, clapping, glockenspiel, guitar, polysynth, synthesizer, synthesizer bass
 Charlie Glenn - guitar, organ, piano, lapsteel

Production
 Naomi Clark - paintings
 Noah Cates - design
 Matt Colton - mastering
 Maria Kanevskaya - photography
 Kate Pruitt - art direction

References 

2016 albums
Thao & the Get Down Stay Down albums
Ribbon Music albums
Albums produced by Merrill Garbus